The members of the 7th convocation of the National Assembly of Armenia were elected on 9 December 2018 and sworn in on 14 January 2019.

Members of the National Assembly

Replacements

See also 

 Government of Armenia
 Politics of Armenia
 Second Pashinyan government
 8th National Assembly of Armenia

References

External links 

  National Assembly website

Members of the National Assembly (Armenia) by term